Abbey Village is a village in the English county of Lancashire and the constituency of Chorley. It is located on the A675 road, six miles (10 km) from Blackburn, eight miles from Chorley, nine miles (14 km) from Preston and ten miles from Bolton.

Etymology
The name is believed to have arisen from a connection with Whalley Abbey, as the village is located close to a track between the abbey and Brinscall Hall.

Community
The village is generally ribbon in layout lying along the A675. It is centred on a now redundant cotton mill which is broken down into industrial units. It has a number of amenities including a pub to the south of the village and an Indian restaurant to the north, which has now closed.
There is also a driving school that operates from the area, aptly named Abbey driver training.

Education

The village has a primary school, Abbey Village County Primary School, with most pupils going on to high schools in Chorley.

Geography
The village is near the Upper and Lower Roddlesworth Reservoirs as well as the West Pennine Moors.

Public Transport

The village was formerly served by Withnell railway station but that closed in 1960.

Public transport now consists solely of the No. 2A bus service between Blackburn and Chorley. From Monday to Saturday Blackburn Bus Company operates the service Every hour throughout the day. In the evenings and on Sundays, Stagecoach Merseyside & South Lancashire runs an hourly service, finishing shortly before midnight.

References

Villages in Lancashire
Geography of Chorley
West Pennine Moors